Arthur John Edmund Sealy (30 November 1903 – 11 November 1944) was an English first-class cricketer.

Sealy was born at Woolwich in November 1903. He was educated at Winchester College, before going up to Brasenose College, Oxford. While studying at Oxford, he played first-class cricket for Oxford University in 1924, making eight appearances. Sealy scored a total of 62 runs in his eight matches, with a high score of 17 not out. With his right-arm medium pace bowling, he took 20 wickets at an average of 27.35 and best figures of 3 for 25. Sealy died at Portsmouth in November 1944. His stepfather, Arthur Pawson, also played first-class cricket.

References

External links

1903 births
1944 deaths
People from Woolwich
People educated at Winchester College
Alumni of Brasenose College, Oxford
English cricketers
Oxford University cricketers